Jean Servais (24 September 1910 – 17 February 1976) was a Belgian film and stage actor.  He acted in many 20th century French cinema productions, from the 1930s through the early 1970s.

He was married to Gilberte Graillot, and later actress Dominique Blanchar.

Career
Servais trained at the Brussels Conservatory of Dramatic Arts, where he won the Second Prize. His acting skills came to the attention of Raymond Rouleau, and he was hired at the Théâtre du Marais, where he acted in Le mal de jeunesse, which was successful in Brussels and in Paris. He was also a member of Jean-Louis Barrault's theatre company.

His first film role was as the simple country dweller who was the victim of an error by the justice system in the film Criminel (1932), directed by Jack Forrester. Servais's film career continued in the 1930s with roles in films such as La Chanson De L'Adieu (1934) and La Vie Est Magnifique (1938). After a break in acting during World War II, he returned to the screen with roles in films such as La Danse De Mort (1948).

In the 1950s, he appeared in the crime drama Rififi  (1955), which François Truffaut ranked as the best film noir, directed by American Jules Dassin, in which he played a leader of a gang of jewel thieves.

He appeared in another film directed by Jules Dassin in 1957, He Who Must Die (Celui qui doit mourir).   He also appeared in a film written and directed by Luis Buñuel, La fièvre monte à El Pao (1959).

In the 1950s and 1960s, Servais rejoined the Renaud-Barrault theatre troupe for several plays, including La Répétition ou l'Amour puni (1950), Volpone (1955), and Marat/Sade (1966).

In the 1960s, Servais took small character roles in popular international fare such as The Longest Day (1962), an epic recreation of the Allied invasion of Normandy, and That Man from Rio (1964). Other films in which he acted include Le Sahara brûle (1961), Un Soir Par Hasard (1964), and Avec la peau des autres (1966).

He had roles in several films in the early 1970s, such as The Devil's Nightmare (1971), an Italian horror series, and Le Protecteur (1974), about a recently released prisoner who tries to find his daughter who has fallen into the underworld of prostitution.

Selected filmography
Films with roles played by Jean Servais include:

 Mater dolorosa (1932)
 Criminal (1933) - Bob Graham
 Youth (1933) - Pierre
 The Faceless Voice (1933) - Gérard
 Les Misérables (1934) - Marius Pontmercy
 Angèle (1934) - Albin
 Amok (1934) - Jan
 Song of Farewell (1934) - Frédéric Chopin
 Dernière heure (1934) - Jean Benoit
 Bourrasque (1935) - Marcel Bardet
 Rose (1936) - Jean Sergent
 Valse éternelle (1936) - Pierre Kramer
 Une fille à papa (1936) - Henri Guiraud
 Les réprouvés (1937) - Prieur
 Gigolette (1937) - Docteur Jacques Bernais
  (1937) - l'ingénieur Philippe Dancourt
  (1939) - Maxime / Massimo
  (1939) - Le docteur Maire
 Quartier sans soleil (1939) - Jo
  (1940) - Paul
  (1941) - Monval
 Fromont jeune et Risler aîné (1941) - Fromont jeune
 Patricia (1942) - Fabien
  (1943) - Anders
 Finance noire (1943) - François Carré
 Mahlia the Mestiza (1943) - Henri de Roussière -le fils des parents adoptifs de Mahlia
  (1944) - Le vicomte Roland de la Chaume - un oisif
 The Seventh Door (1947) - Le chauffeur du car
 Prelude to Madness (1948) - Enrico Miller - il violinista
 The Dance of Death (1948) - Kurt
 Une si jolie petite plage (1949) - Fred
 Mademoiselle de La Ferté (1949) - Lord Osborne
 Le furet (1950) - Stadler
 The Glass Castle (1950)
 Une si jolie petite plage (1950) - Laurent Bertal (French version)
 Le Plaisir (1952) - L'ami de Jean / La voix de Maupassant (segment "Le Modèle")
 Mina de Vanghel (1953) - Ruppert
 Rue de l'Estrapade (1953) - Jacques Christian
 Tourbillon (1953) - Fred Maurin
 Le Chevalier de la nuit (1953) - Le châtelain
 Les crimes de l'amour (1953) - Ruppert (segment 1 : 'Mina de Vanghel')
 Rififi (1955) - Tony le Stéphanois
 Heroes and Sinners, Les héros sont fatigués (1955) - François Séverin
 Le couteau sous la gorge (1955) - Marc Hourtin
 The Lebanese Mission (1956) - Maj. Charles Hobson
 He Who Must Die (1957) - Priest Fotis
 La roue (1957) - Pierre Pelletier
 Quand la femme s'en mêle, He Who Must Die (1957) - Henri Godot
 Tamango (1958) - Doctor Corot
 That Night (1958) - André Reverdy
 Les Jeux dangereux (1958) - Fournier, le détective privé
 La Fièvre Monte à El Pao (1959) - Alejandro Gual
 Murder at 45 R.P.M. (1960) - Maurice Faugères
 Le Sahara brûle (1961) - Wagner
 World in My Pocket (1961) - Gypo
 Les Menteurs (1961) - Paul Dutraz
 Le jeu de la vérité (1961) - Jean-François Vérate
 The Corsican Brothers (1961) - Gerolamo Sagona
 Le Crime ne paie pas (1962) - Ernest Vaughan (segment "L'affaire Hugues")
 The Longest Day (1962) - Rear Admiral Robert Jaujard
 The Cage (1963) - Rispal
  (1963) - Commissaire Beronnet
  (1963) - Piort
 Una spia sulla città, Rififi in the City (1963) - Maurice Leprince
 That Man from Rio (1964) - Prof. Norbert Catalan
  (1965) - Dr. Roussel
 Thomas the Impostor (1965) - Pasquel-Duport
 Lost Command (1966) - General Melies
 Avec la peau des autres (1966) - Wegelt
 Qualcuno ha tradito (1967) - Jean
 Coplan Saves His Skin (1968) - Saroghu
 Black Jesus (1968) - Commander
 Better a Widow (1968) - Baron Misceni
 They Came to Rob Las Vegas (1968) - Gino
 Peau d'âne (1970) - La voix de (voice)
 The Devil's Nightmare (1971) - Baron von Rhoneberg
  (1972) - De Gournais, le directeur de la galerie
 L'Affaire Crazy Capo (1973) - Joseph Marchesi, dit Crazy Capo
 Le Protecteur (1974) - Ancelin
 Un tueur, un flic, ainsi soit-il... (1977) - Forzi (final film role)

References

Further reading
 Yvan Foucart: Dictionnaire des comédiens français disparus, Mormoiron : Éditions cinéma, 2008, p. 1185,

External links
 

Belgian male stage actors
Belgian male film actors
French male film actors
1910 births
1976 deaths
Actors from Antwerp
Burials at Passy Cemetery
20th-century Belgian male actors